Cascade Mountain is located in Portage, Wisconsin. It has 47 trails, 4 terrain parks, and an 800-foot-long chute for snow tubing.

Location
Cascade Mountain is located on Interstate 90/94 between Madison, Wisconsin and Wisconsin Dells, Wisconsin in Columbia County, Wisconsin. It is 30 minutes northwest of Madison and 15 to 20 minutes south of Wisconsin Dells.

Trails
Cascade Mountain offers 47 trails varying from beginner, intermediate, to advanced. Open to both skiers and snowboarders the runs break down to 38% beginner runs, 24% intermediate runs, and 38% advanced runs. "The longest trail at Cascade Mountain is called "Far Out", a beginner cruiser trail that takes you past old growth forests, waterfalls, rock formations and more scenic terrain. It is 5,300 feet long, or just over a mile."

See also
List of ski areas and resorts in the United States

References

External links

Ski areas and resorts in Wisconsin
Tourism in Wisconsin
Buildings and structures in Columbia County, Wisconsin
Tourist attractions in Columbia County, Wisconsin